Crazy Couple is a 1979 Hong Kong martial arts comedy film directed by Ricky Lau and starring Dean Shek and Lau Ka-yung.

Plot
Street performer Cho brings his pet around to perform hoping to raise money to study martial arts. Retired martial arts master Chiu Chat-yeh has a mentally disabled daughter who is unattended and has Cho take care of her. Cho finds a girl from out of town named Piu-hung to take his spot as Chiu's daughter's caretaker and goes to study martial arts with the village's martial arts teacher, Kwan Yee-sai. Cho also befriends Kwan's son, Yan. One day, a group of bandits come and terrorize the village and Chiu and Kwan team up to resist them. Chiu has stolen jewelry in his house which is unexpectedly stolen by Piu-hung. Chiu and Kwan are killed later as well. Cho and Yan flee to many places and seek a teacher to mentor them in martial arts. With continuous twists and turns along the way, they finally find the real culprit behind the scenes.

Cast
Dean Shek as Yan
Lau Ka-yung as Cho
Lily Li as Piu-hung
Fung Hark-On as Mak Tai-lo
Wong Ching as Chiu Yat-yeh
Huang Ha as Yan and Cho's teacher
Eric Tsang as Chiu's daughter
Peter Chan as Kwan Yee-sai
Ho Pak-kwong
Mars
Chik Ngai-hung
Bruce Tong as Wong Lu-fu
Danny Chow
Wong Chi-keung
Ho Kei-cheung
Tam Po
Ho Po-sing
Chan Siu-kai
Ho Chi-wah
Wong Hak
Fung Ming
Cheung Chi-ping
Ling Chi-hung

Box office
The film grossed HK$1,638,491.30 at the Hong Kong box office during its theatrical run from 30 December 1979 to 8 January 1980.

References 

 "Wu zhao sheng you zhao".MTIME . Retrieved 7 April 2020.

External links

Crazy Couple at Hong Kong Cinemagic

1979 films
1979 martial arts films
1970s action comedy films
Hong Kong action comedy films
Hong Kong martial arts comedy films
Hong Kong slapstick comedy films
Kung fu films
1970s Cantonese-language films
Films shot in Hong Kong
1979 comedy films
1970s Hong Kong films